Linn Peterson (born 8 January 1994) is a Swedish ice hockey forward, currently playing in the Swedish Women's Hockey League (SDHL) with Luleå HF/MSSK. She represented  in the women's ice hockey tournament at the 2022 Winter Olympics in Beijing.

Playing career
Peterson joined Leksands IF Dam in the 2010–11 Riksserien season and remained with the team until 2015. She joined Brynäs IF Dam for the 2015–16 season before signing with Luleå HF/MSSK in the 2016–17 season. She has gone on to win three Swedish Championship titles with Luleå.

International play

As a member of the Swedish national under-18 team, Peterson played in the IIHF U18 World Championships in 2011 and 2012, winning the bronze medal in the latter year. She was a member of the Swedish team at the 2012 Winter Youth Olympics, where she won a gold medal. 

Peterson was a late addition to the Swedish delegation at the 2022 Winter Olympics, serving as a replacement for Hanna Olsson, who tested positive for COVID-19 prior to the Games.

References

External links
 
 

1994 births
Living people
Brynäs IF Dam players
Ice hockey players at the 2012 Winter Youth Olympics
Ice hockey players at the 2022 Winter Olympics
Leksands IF Dam players
Luleå HF/MSSK players
Olympic ice hockey players of Sweden
People from Mariestad Municipality
Sportspeople from Västra Götaland County
Swedish ice hockey right wingers
Swedish women's ice hockey forwards
Youth Olympic gold medalists for Sweden